The following lists events that happened during 1998 in Sierra Leone.

Incumbents
President: Ahmad Tejan Kabbah (starting February 13)
Vice-President: Albert Joe Demby
Chief Justice: Desmond Edgar Luke

Events

February
 February 12 - Fighting between Nigerian troops and the military government of Sierra Leone now reach Freetown.

October
 October 12 - 23 men and 1 woman are publicly shot at a stone quarry for partaking in a coup the year prior.

References

 
Years of the 20th century in Sierra Leone
1990s in Sierra Leone
Sierra Leone
Sierra Leone